Kaleiçi  is the historic city center of Antalya, Turkey. Until modern times, almost the entire city was confined within its walls. It has structures dating from the Roman, Byzantine, Seljuk, Ottoman and modern Turkish republican eras. Most of it however, dates to the late 18th and 19th centuries. While some of the traditional Turkish homes are occupied by residents, many have been converted into boutique hotels, restaurants and shops selling handicrafts and other folkloric arts. The area has been undergoing to an extensive restoration by the municipality of Antalya.

The Kaleiçi  area is located in the centre-eastern portion of the city along the mediterranean coast fronted by the yacht harbour that dates to the Roman era.

The name Kaleiçi means "Inside the Kale" or "Inner Kale" (Kale itself means castle or fortress).

Landmarks 
Antalya Clock Tower
Hadrian's Gate
Hıdırlık Tower
İskele mosque
Kalekapısı
Karatay Medrese
Kesik Minare
Yacht Harbour
Yivli Minare
Mermerli Beach
Mermerli Park
Pazar Hamamı
Suna & Inan Kıraç Kaleiçi Museum
Tekeli Mehmet Paşa Mosque
Yat Limani
Mevlevihane Museum
Gavur(Yenikapi) Hamamı
Aya Yorgi Greek Church
Saint Alypius Greek Church 
Antalya Ethnography Museum
Kara Molla Masjid
Ahi Kizi Masjid
Ahi Yusuf Masjid
Imaret Madrasa
Giyaseddin Keyhüsrev Madrasa
Balıkpazarı Hamamı
Antalya Old city walls

Antalya
Muratpaşa District